is a district located in Shiga Prefecture, Japan.

As of 2003, the district has an estimated population of 23,638 and a density of 150.21 persons per km2. The total area is 157.37 km2.

Towns
Kōra
Taga
Toyosato

Transition

Light blue autonomies are Inukami District's town, deep blue autonomies are Inukami District's village, and gray autonomies are others.

Districts in Shiga Prefecture